The following is the organization of the Union and Confederate forces engaged at the Battle of Rich Mountain, during the American Civil War in 1861.

Abbreviations used

Military Rank
 Gen = General
 LTG = Lieutenant General
 MG = Major General
 BG = Brigadier General
 Col = Colonel
 Ltc = Lieutenant Colonel
 Maj = Major
 Cpt = Captain
 Lt = Lieutenant

Other
 w = wounded
 mw = mortally wounded
 k = killed
 m = missing

Union forces
Department of the Ohio (Army of Occupation): MG George B. McClellan

Confederate forces
Army of the Northwest: BG Robert S. Garnett

References

External links
 Rich Mountain Battlefield

American Civil War orders of battle